Alphenal (Alphenal, Efrodal, Prophenal, Sanudorm), also known as 5-allyl-5-phenylbarbituric acid, is a barbiturate derivative developed in the 1920s. It has primarily anticonvulsant properties, and was used occasionally for the treatment of epilepsy or convulsions, although not as commonly as better known barbiturates such as phenobarbital.

LD50: Mouse (Oral): 280 mg/kg

References 

Barbiturates
Hypnotics
Allyl compounds
GABAA receptor positive allosteric modulators
Phenyl compounds